Sarah's Room  also known as To Here Knows When,  is a 2013 psychedelic ambient horror/thriller directed by Grant McPhee and written by Chris Purnell. It follows the relationship between Joe (Patrick O’Brien) and Emma (Kitty Colquhoun) and their enigmatic lodger, Sarah (Hanna Stanbridge). The film is McPhee's debut feature.

Plot 
On returning to the home he shares with his wife in Edinburgh after a mysterious absence, Joe has to get to grips with the presence of Sarah, a lodger taken by Emma. Struggling with his wife's relationship with Sarah and his own obsessive thoughts and paranoia, his life falls apart as he turns to alcohol, taking a dramatic turn when his perceptions spill into reality.

Production 
Sarah's Room was made for $6,000 in just over 5 days in Edinburgh in 2013. McPhee has said that he aimed to create something that “looked far more expensive and unusual than the majority of micro budget feature films.” To this end, the film was shot on Red, with second unit footage captured using DLSR. The film was edited on-set parallel to filming.

Music 
Sarah's Room is scored by Scottish musicians. Alec Cheer and Drew Wright, who were nominated for Best Original Music at the 2014 BAFTA Scotland New Talent Awards.

Release  
The film premiered at the 2013 New York Bootleg Film Festival, before going on to show at the Eureka Springs Digital Film Festival, Boston Independent Film Festival and the Los Angeles Independent Film Festival.

Critical reception 

The film was released on DVD and Streaming services in 2014 to mixed reviews.

Eye for Film gave it 3/5 stars saying "the film moves too slowly at first but gradually gathers pace, building to a much stronger conclusion."

Micro Filmmaker Review - “As much as this film frustrated me due to its sheer subjectivity and made me want to rant against it, the fact is: Sarah’s Room is created to the objective levels needed for it to enter the world of art, where it has the right to be completely subjective. It is not a horror film; it is an experimental film for lovers of arthouse cinema.”

Film Pulse - “The fact that a movie made for only £4,000 can look this good is a testament that one doesn’t need a seven-figure budget to make something look great. It’s these visuals that prove to be the highlight of Sarah’s Room, accentuating the disjointed confusion of the film. Conversely, this confusion parlays into the audience’s perception of the movie, resulting in a plot muddled by lack of exposition.”

The Independent Critic gave it 3.5/5 stars - “...a thoughtful and compelling film that pulls you in even as you don't quite realize exactly when you're being pulled in. The characters are certainly compelling and the cast, including a terrific Hannah Stanbridge along with the equally good Patrick O'Brien and Kitty Colquhoun, is uniformly strong and never less than convincing. It happens far too often in this kind of film that the performances give away the film's twists and turns, but this terrific ensemble cast does a great job of remaining mysterious while being emotionally resonant.”

Film Threat - “Grant McPhee’s feature film, Sarah’s Room, is a stylish, yet slow paced, psychological drama... Overall,... there is much to like within Sarah’s Room, but ... it makes full engagement with the material difficult. Too often the film feels like it is spinning its wheels, and when it does wrap up and you look back, you realize the narrative journey it took you on was actually very short, all things considered.”

Awards

References

External links
 

2013 films
2010s English-language films